In fluid dynamics, the wave height of a surface wave is the difference between the elevations of a crest and a neighboring trough. Wave height is a term used by mariners, as well as in coastal, ocean and naval engineering.

At sea, the term significant wave height is used as a means to introduce a well-defined and standardized statistic to denote the characteristic height of the random waves in a sea state, including wind sea and swell. It is defined in such a way that it more or less corresponds to what a mariner observes when estimating visually the average wave height.

Definitions 

Depending on context, wave height may be defined in different ways:

For a sine wave, the wave height H is twice the amplitude (i.e., the peak-to-peak amplitude): 
For a periodic wave, it is simply the difference between the maximum and minimum of the surface elevation :  with cp the phase speed (or propagation speed) of the wave. The sine wave is a specific case of a periodic wave.
In random waves at sea, when the surface elevations are measured with a wave buoy, the individual wave height Hm of each individual wave—with an integer label m, running from 1 to N, to denote its position in a sequence of N waves—is the difference in elevation between a wave crest and trough in that wave. For this to be possible, it is necessary to first split the measured time series of the surface elevation into individual waves. Commonly, an individual wave is denoted as the time interval between two successive downward-crossings through the average surface elevation (upward crossings might also be used). Then the individual wave height of each wave is again the difference between maximum and minimum elevation in the time interval of the wave under consideration.

Significant wave height

RMS wave height
Another wave-height statistic in common usage is the root-mean-square (or RMS) wave height Hrms, defined as:  with Hm again denoting the individual wave heights in a certain time series.

See also 
Sea state
Wind wave

Notes

References 

, 387 pages.
, 704 pages.
, viii & 336 pages. 

Water waves
Physical oceanography